The 2019 UTEP Miners football team represented University of Texas at El Paso in the 2019 NCAA Division I FBS football season. The Miners were led by second–year head coach Dana Dimel and played their home games at Sun Bowl. They were members of the West Division of Conference USA (C–USA). UTEP averaged 17,093 fans per game. That was 2,938 more fans per game than 2018; the 23rd best increase in FBS.

Previous season
The Miners finished the 2018 season 1–11 and 1–7 to finish tied in sixth place in Conference USA play and did not qualify for a bowl game.

Preseason

C–USA media poll
Conference USA released their preseason media poll on July 16, 2019, with the Miners predicted to finish last in the West Division.

Preseason All–Conference USA teams
2019 Preseason All–Conference USA

Schedule
UTEP announced its 2019 football schedule on January 10, 2019. The 2019 schedule consists of 6 home and 6 away games in the regular season.

Schedule Source:

Game summaries

Houston Baptist

at Texas Tech

Nevada

at Southern Miss

UTSA

at FIU

Louisiana Tech

at North Texas

Charlotte

at UAB

at New Mexico State

Rice

References

UTEP
UTEP Miners football seasons
UTEP Miners football